The Certificate Examinations in Polish as a Foreign Language (Polish: Egzaminy Certyfikatowe z Języka Polskiego jako Obcego), also referred as State Certificate Examinations in Polish as a Foreign Language (Polish: Państwowe Egzaminy Certyfikatowe z Języka Polskiego jako Obcego), are standardized tests of Polish language proficiency for non-native Polish speakers. The examinations are held by the State Commission for the Certification of Proficiency in Polish as a Foreign Language (Polish: Państwowa Komisja Poświadczania Znajomości Języka Polskiego jako Obcego) starting from 2004 in Poland as well as in foreign countries. Candidates passing the examinations would obtain a certificate indicating the level of their proficiency in Polish. There are currently three levels of examinations set according to the Common European Framework of Reference for Languages, namely, B1, B2 and C2. The State Certification Commission is at the meantime working on the introduction of examinations for the remaining levels (A1, A2 and C1).

This is the only state document that could confirm one's proficiency in Polish.

History
On 3 July 2003, pursuant to the Language Act, the State Commission for the Certification of Proficiency in Polish as a Foreign Language was established by the Minister of Education, with the aim to setting up a certificate examination for Polish as a foreign language.

The examination was first organized in 2004 in both Poland and abroad.

The standards of examination and rules of procedure are based on the guidelines of the Council of Europe, with the aim of standardizing foreign language proficiency tests across Europe. In 2008, Association of Language Testers in Europe (ALTE) audited the examinations and confirm that they are run according to the guidelines.

Aim
The chief aim of the examinations is to determine candidates’ level of proficiency in Polish regardless of the institution and location the candidates learn Polish and the adopted curriculum, educational materials and methods of the candidates.

Organization
The examinations are organized by State Commission for the Certification of Proficiency in Polish as a Foreign Language, which is composed of representatives from major teaching centers teaching Polish as a foreign language. The commission is responsible for setting dates of examinations, appointing examination boards members, developing examinations materials, monitoring examination and issuing certificates to those who have passed the tests.

Examinations are staged at least three times a year in spring, summer and autumn. Currently, only three levels of examination are available. Candidates can sit for the basic (B1), general intermediate (B2) or advanced (C2) examination, the level of which are set according to the Common European Framework of Reference for Languages. The state certificate commission is working on the introduction of the remaining levels of examinations.

Requirements of sitting for the exams
All foreigners and Polish citizens permanently residing abroad may sit for the examination, except that candidates taking the B1 and B2 examinations must be at least 16 years old and those who sit for the C2 examination must age 18 or above.

Candidates having special needs can also apply for the examinations, and special adjustments of form of the examination, like extending the time of examinations or using specialized equipment and technical devices, could be arranged.

Application
Registration forms could be sent on-line, by fax or mail. A letter of confirmation would be sent to the candidate after the application form has been received. The examination would be staged if there are at least twenty candidates applying to sit the examination at a particular examination center. Examination fees should be paid on or before the deadline shown on the letter of confirmation by bank transfer.

Information about the date and time of the examination would be sent to candidates by e-mail as well as mail.

The examination fees are €60 (B1), €80 (B2) and €100 (C2) respectively. Successful candidates need to pay an additional €20 for their certificate.

Examination
The examination consists of five sub-tests, divided into two parts, i.e. a written part and an oral part. At all levels, the structure of the written part is the same, varying only in terms of difficulty. The written part comprises Listening Comprehension (Part A), Accuracy/Grammar in Use (Part B), Reading Comprehension (Part C) and Writing (Part D), whereas the oral examination tests only Oral Communication (Part E).

The oral part of the examinations is carried out on the same day or on the next day of the written examinations. Candidates need to make oral statements based on different written and graphic materials. Candidates have to draw one out of three sets of materials in order to determine which set of task they are required to complete. The tasks and duration of the oral part are different for different levels.

Assessment
Examinations are assessed by examination commissions appointed by the State Commission for the Certification of Proficiency in Polish as a Foreign Language.

Each examination consists of five sub-tests of equal value, with each of the sub-test bearing a maximum of 40 points. The maximum points of the examination is thus 200. In order to pass the examination, a candidate has to score at least 60% of points, i.e. 24 points, in each of five sub-tests.

Every sub-test is assessed by two markers, who check against:
 Task completion (content, length, form, composition)
 Grammar accuracy
 Vocabulary
 Register
 Spelling and punctuation
 Pronunciation and fluency (only for Part E)

Each marker can give a maximum 20 points, and hence the maximum points for the examinations are 200.

While the marking criteria in Part A, B and C are relatively objective, the marking for writing and oral expression is more subjective. Unavoidable though it is, subjectivity in these sub-tests is limited by the standardization of assessment criteria, double rating and training of examiners.

Examination marks are awarded according to the following scale:

Failed candidates may re-take the examination at the same level after one year. Or, if they find it appropriate, they may launch an appeal to the Commission. Upon the candidate’s request the President of the Commission may allow him to review, in his presence, relevant sub-tests assessed by the examination board.

Certificate
After six weeks of the examination, the candidates would receive notification about their results. For those who have passed, they would need to pay an extra €20 for the certificate, and the Commission would issue the certificate upon receiving the payment. Candidates would receive their certificate by registered mail.

The certificate is with supplement in English with a detailed description of the results.

Benefits of obtaining the certificate
According to the provisions of the Regulation of the Minister of Science and Higher Education of 12 October 2006 on taking up and carrying out studies by foreigners, foreign students should have passed the B2 Certificate Examinations in Polish as a Foreign Language in order to be able to study in a Polish school or university, where teaching activities are conducted in Polish. The requirement is looser for artistic and sports-related disciplines (e.g. music, arts, physical education studies) and a B1 basic proficiency in Polish is enough for these subjects.

Besides education, the certificates may also be useful in certain job areas. For instance, the Ministry for Infrastructure, before granting a license for conducting real estate business, requires the submission of a certificate in Polish as a foreign language at C2 level. Employees in health sector would also need to prove their language proficiency — the Chambers of Nurses in Poland require foreigners employed by Polish hospitals and medical centres to have a certificate in Polish as a foreign language at B1 level. According to the Regulation on Civil Service, foreigners applying for jobs in civil service are also required to provide a certificate in Polish as a foreign language at B2 level.

The certificate is gaining popularity among the upper-secondary students in several countries, notably in Germany and the United States. In some countries, the certificate can serve as a document certifying the command of an additional foreign language, which entitles students to obtain additional points during a matriculation examination.

References

External links
 The official homepage of the examinations
 Language requirement of studying in Polish
 Polish citizenship guide
 Studying in Poland

Polish language
Language tests
Education in Poland